Expo 61 was the international labour exhibition held in 1961 in the Italian City of Turin. It was the 15th specialized exposition recognized by the Bureau International des Expositions (BIE).
Italy used the opportunity to expand the event with an exposition celebrating the centennial of Italian unity. The result is that the exhibition is widely remembered as Italia '61.

The labour exhibition 
The international part of the expo 61 was held in the purpose built  Palazzo del Lavoro (Labour Palace) designed by the Italian architect Pier Luigi Nervi. The roof is supported by 16 pillars each 25 meters heigh, each supporting a 38 x 38 meter concrete element. Glass panels between the concrete elements allows daylight into the 25.000 m2 hall. The walls are made of glass panels supported by a metal frame at the outside of the building.

Italia '61 
The Italian part of the expo 61 was located between the Palazzo del Lavoro and the carmuseum, two kilometers north. The Italian provinces were represented with pavilions along the river Po at the eastside of the Corso Unità d'Italia (Lane of Italian unity). At the westside an eventcentre, the Palavela was built. During the 2006 Winter Olympics this hall was used as venue for figure skating and shorttrack. Visitors could use a monorail for an 1800m ride between the northern entrance at the car museum and the Palazzo del Lavoro at the southside of the exposition. An aerial cableway provided access to the Parco Europa, a viewpoint at the other side of the Po.

See also 
 Prima Esposizione Internazionale d'Arte Decorativa Moderna (1902)
 Turin International (1911)
 The International Expo of Sport (1955)
 Italia '61-Regione Piemonte (Turin Metro)
 List of world's fairs

External links
 International Labour Exhibition – Turin 1961
 Expo 1961 – Torino (Italian)

World's fairs in Turin
1961 festivals
Centennial anniversaries
1960s in Turin
1961 in Italy